Carole Pateman (born 11 December 1940) is a feminist and political theorist. She is known as a critic of liberal democracy and has been a member of the British Academy since 2007.

Biography 

Pateman was born in Maresfield, Sussex, England. Educated at Lewes County Grammar School for Girls, she left at age 16. She entered Ruskin College, Oxford in 1963 studying economics, politics, history and sociology, achieving a distinction. She won a place at Lady Margaret Hall to read PPE, staying on to earn a DPhil. 

In 1972, she became lecturer in political theory at the University of Sydney. Since 1990, Professor Pateman has taught in the Department of Political Science at the University of California at Los Angeles (UCLA), where she is now Distinguished Professor Emeritus. Professor Pateman served as (the first woman) President of the International Political Science Association (1991–1994). In 2007, she was named a Fellow of the British Academy. She served as president of the American Political Science Association in 2010–2011.  She is also an Honorary Professor for the Cardiff University School of European Studies.

She gave the Faculty Research Lecture at UCLA in 2001, and is a Fellow of the American Academy of Arts and Sciences, the British Academy and the UK Academy of Social Sciences. She holds honorary degrees from the Australian National University, the National University of Ireland, and Helsinki University.

Awards 
Pateman was a Guggenheim Fellow 1993–1994.

Since 1994 Pateman has been a Member of the International Advisory Board of the Swedish Collegium for Advanced Study in the Social Sciences.

In 2012 she was awarded the Johan Skytte Prize in Political Science.

In 2013, she earned the Special Recognition Award by the UK Political Studies Association.

In April 2015, she was elected as a Fellow of the Learned Society of Wales.

The Australian Political Science Association (APSA) awards the Carole Pateman prize biennially for the best book published on the topic of gender and politics.

Bibliography

Books
 
 
 
 Pateman, Carole (1988). The Sexual Contract. Cambridge: Polity in association with Blackwell.

Edited books
 
 
 
 
  Original printed in 1986.

Chapters in books

Journal articles

Videos
 The Equivalent of the Right to Land, Life, and Liberty? Democracy and the Idea of a Basic Income (Link)

See also
 Feminism in the United Kingdom
 Universal basic income in the United Kingdom

References

Further reading

External links
 
 Carole Pateman Papers - Pembroke Center Archives, Brown University

1940 births
British feminists
British political philosophers
Living people
Fellows of the Academy of Social Sciences
Fellows of the British Academy
British social commentators
International Political Science Association scholars
Universal basic income in the United Kingdom